Parnassius simonius is a high-altitude butterfly which is found only in the Pamir Mountains of Central Asia. The type locality is Aram-Kunghei, Zaalaisky Mountains, Kyrgyzstan. It is a member of the snow Apollo genus (Parnassius) of the swallowtail family, Papilionidae.

P. simonius is found on slopes at 3,400-4,500 m flying in July. The larva is associated with Lagotis decumbens and Veronica luetkeana.

Identification

P. simo differs from P. simonius by the upper hindwing having its submarginal band represented by a discontinuous row of arrow-like teeth and from P. boedromius, by the upper hindwing submarginal band being smoothly dentate (tooth like).

Subspecies
 Parnassius simonius simonius
 Parnassius simonius grayi Avinoff, 1916
 Parnassius simonius nigrificatus Kreuzberg, 1986
 Parnassius simonius taldicus Gundorov, 1991

References

Further reading
sv:Parnassius simonius  - Swedish Wikipedia provides further references and synonymy

simonius
Butterflies described in 1889